The 2010–11 SV Werder Bremen season began on 5 July with their first training session. Werder Bremen will play its matches at Weserstadion.

Season
Approximately 250 angry Werder Bremen supporters confronted Werder Bremen coaches and players after a 4–0 loss to Hamburger SV. The fans prevented the team bus from entering the stadium; they demanded, and received, a face-to-face confrontation with the coach and players.

Werder Bremen's 13th-place finish was the worst in more than a decade.

Matches

Bundesliga

DFB-Pokal

UEFA Champions League

Play-off round

Group stage

Squad information

Transfers

In:

Out:

First-team squad
Squad at end of season

Left club during season

Squad statistics

References

Notes

SV Werder Bremen seasons
Werder Bremen
Werder Bremen